Abarema oxyphyllidia is a species of plant in the family Fabaceae. It is endemic to the Cordillera Guajiquiro in southwest Honduras. It is found in mixed montane forest, and is known from only one specimen collected in 1964.

References

oxyphyllidia
Endemic flora of Honduras
Taxonomy articles created by Polbot